Leonard Malik (25 October 1908 – 10 October 1945) was a Polish footballer. He played in one match for the Poland national football team in 1930.

Personal life
Malik's cousin Richard was also a footballer, who played for Germany. 

Malik, who briefly served in the Polish Army in 1929, was an ethnic German of socialist views which caused him to be jailed at Bereza Kartuska Prison in 1938-39 as an opponent of the interwar Polish government. During the German occupation of Poland in the Second World War, Malik ran a casino for Wehrmacht personnel in Pionki. Accused of being a Gestapo informant, he was arrested by the Polish People's Republic and died in a forced labour camp on 10 October 1945.

References

External links
 

1908 births
1945 deaths
Polish footballers
Poland international footballers
Place of birth missing
Association footballers not categorized by position
Sportspeople from Katowice
Polish people who died in prison custody
Prisoners who died in Polish People's Republic detention
20th-century Polish businesspeople
Businesspeople in the casino industry
20th-century Polish military personnel
Polish Army personnel